Ina Großmann  (born 21 August 1990) is a German handball player for Thüringer HC and the German national team.

She participated at the 2018 European Women's Handball Championship.

International honours 
EHF Cup:
Finalist: 2016

References

External links

1990 births
Living people
German female handball players